Kraksaan is a town, an administrative district and the regency seat of Probolinggo Regency, East Java, Indonesia. Its population was 65,590 at the Census of 2010 and 68,146 at the 2020 Census.

Climate
Kraksaan has a tropical savanna climate (Aw) with moderate to little rainfall from April to November and heavy rainfall from December to March.

References

Regency seats of East Java